IDPS or IDPs may refer to:

Intrusion Detection and Prevention Systems
Internally displaced persons